Shehu Umar Ibn Abubakar Garbai was the Shehu of Borno from 1968 to 1974.

Reign
Shehu Umar Ibn Abubakar Garbai (son of Shehu Abubakar Garbai of Borno) was the Shehu of Borno from 1968 to 1974.

Footnotes

Bibliography

Sheriff, Bosoma, Muhammad Fannami, and Abba Rufai Tijani, Functions of Shettima Kanuribe: Instances in the Shehu of Borno's Palace (Maiduguri: Desktop Investment Ltd., 2011).

Dynasty

Royalty of Borno
1974 deaths
Year of birth missing